Uraiyūr Maruthuvan Thāmōtharanār (Tamil: உறையூர் மருத்துவன் தாமோதரனார்) was a poet of the Sangam period, to whom 6 verses of the Sangam literature have been attributed, including verse 11 of the Tiruvalluva Maalai.

Biography
Dhamodharanar, known in full as Uraiyur Marutthuvan Dhamodharanar, lived in Uraiyur and was a physician by profession, hence came to be called thus. He was known as a worshiper of Lord Vishnu. He has sung in praise of the Chola King Kurappalli Thunjiya Perunthirumavalavan and Pittan Kottran in verses 60, 170, and 321 of the Purananuru. He is believed to be the contemporary of Sangam poets Kovoor Kilar, Madalan Madurai Kumaranar, and Kaveri Poompattanatthu Kaari Kannanar, since these poets, too, have sung on the Chola ruler.

Contribution to the Sangam literature
Marutthuvan Dhamodharanar has written 6 Sangam verses, including 3 in Purananuru (verses 60, 170, and 321), 2 in Agananuru (verses 133 and 257), and 1 in Tiruvalluva Maalai (verse 11).

Views on Valluvar and the Kural
Marutthuvan Dhamodharanar opines about Valluvar and the Kural text thus:

See also

 Sangam literature
 List of Sangam poets
 Tiruvalluva Maalai

Notes

References

 
 
 

Tamil philosophy
Tamil poets
Sangam poets
Tiruvalluva Maalai contributors